The Lena N. Gale Cabin, in a development near Lake Tahoe at 726 Cedar St. in Zephyr Cove, Nevada, is a historic building built in 1940.  Also known as Good Medicine Cabin, it is an example of Rustic architecture.  It was listed on the National Register of Historic Places in 2001.

It was deemed significant for its architecture.  Its NRHP nomination argues that it "typifies the development of middle class summer recreation opportunities at Lake Tahoe during the mid-20th century" and that it is "an excellent local example of the Rustic Style of architecture favored for mountain recreational dwellings during the first half of the 20th century."

References 

Houses completed in 1940
Houses on the National Register of Historic Places in Nevada
Log cabins in the United States
National Register of Historic Places in Douglas County, Nevada
Houses in Douglas County, Nevada
Log buildings and structures on the National Register of Historic Places in Nevada